Staying Vertical is a 2016 French drama film written and directed by Alain Guiraudie. The story follows a filmmaker who has to raise a child (whom he had with a shepherdess) by himself whilst seeking inspiration for his new film. The film was selected to compete for the Palme d'Or at the 2016 Cannes Film Festival.

Cast 
 Damien Bonnard as Léo
 India Hair as Marie
 Raphaël Thiéry as Jean-Louis
 Christian Bouillette as Marcel 
 Basile Meilleurat as Yoan 
 Laure Calamy as Doctor Mirande

Reception
Review aggregation website Rotten Tomatoes reported an approval rating of 65%, based on 23 reviews, with an average score of 6.2/10. On Metacritic, which assigns a normalized rating, the film has a score of 65 out of 100, based on 17 critics, indicating "generally favorable reviews".

Accolades

References

External links 
 

2016 films
2016 drama films
2010s French-language films
French drama films
Films directed by Alain Guiraudie
Films about filmmaking
French LGBT-related films
2016 LGBT-related films
LGBT-related drama films
2010s French films